By-elections for twenty eight  state assembly constituencies were  held in Madhya Pradesh on 3 November 2020.

Background 

In March 2020, Congress leader Jyotiraditya Scindia, along with 22 Congress MLAs, defected to the BJP. This resulted in the toppling of the Kamal Nath ministry and the ascendancy of Shivraj Singh Chouhan-led BJP government. By 23 July 2020, another 3 Congress MLAs (Pradyuman Singh Lodhi (of Malhara), Sumitra Devi Kasdekar (of Nepanagar) and Narayan Patel (of Mandhata)) had resigned to join the BJP.

In addition, 3 seats (Joura, Agar and Biaora) became vacant due to the deaths of their respective sitting MLAs.  The elections were scheduled to be held on or before September 2020, but got delayed due to the COVID-19 pandemic.

Election schedule

Results

Summary

Results by constituency
Source

See also
 2020 Madhya Pradesh political crisis

References

2020
2020s in Madhya Pradesh
Madhya Pradesh
2020